Annwyn, Beneath the Waves is the second album by Faith and the Muse.

Track listing

Credits 
 All instruments and voices performed by William Faith and Monica Richards
 Treatments and Programming by Chad Blinman
 Produced by Faith and the Muse and Chad Blinman
 All titles composed by Faith and the Muse c and p Elyrian Music, BMI, 1996 except:
 "Hob Y Derri Dando," Traditional Welsh song
 "The Sea Angler," text by Johann Wolfgang von Goethe
 "Rise and Forget," by Monica Richards, William Faith and Stevyn Grey
 Recorded and mixed October 1995-March 1996 by Chad Blinman at The Eye Socket, Venice, California
 Mastered by Joe Gastwirt and Ramón Bretón at Ocean View Digital, Los Angeles, California
 Cover painting "Annwyn, Beneath the Waves" by Monica Richards, acrylic and glass on canvas, 1995 (with a nod to the great Gustav Klimt)
 Layout, Artwork and Design by Monica Richards
 All Photography and additional Graphics by Clovis IV of Vertigo Graphic Arts, Santa Barbara, California
 Original lyrics by Monica Richards, except "The Hand of Man" and "Cernunnos", written by William Faith, "Rise & Forget" cowritten by Monica & William.

References 

Faith and the Muse albums
1996 albums